The Swiss Epic is an annual mountain bike stage race held in the Canton of Grisons, Switzerland. It has been accredited as hors catégorie (beyond categorisation) by the Union Cycliste Internationale. It is part of the global Epic Series and was once inspired by the pinnacle event of it, the Cape Epic.

Alongside the Cape Epic and The Pioneer in New Zealand, the Swiss Epic is considered a Legend Race. Legend races are the top category of the global Epic Series, and any rider resolute enough to complete three Epic Series races, including the pinnacle event, the Absa Cape Epic, gets awarded with Epic Legend status. This status is immortalised in the form of an Epic Legend medal.

History
The Swiss Epic was founded in 2014. Joko Vogel, Dany Gehrig, and Thomas Frischknecht had the idea of a multi-day stage race in Switzerland whereby the Cape Epic in South Africa has been used a model.

In 2014, two months after the first edition, the Union Cycliste Internationale (UCI) granted the hors catégorie.

In 2018, the parliament of the Canton of Grisons signed a five-year contract with the Swiss Epic that they spend 300.000 CHF each year. Therefore, the race was relocated from the Canton of Valais to the Canton of Grisons. The Swiss Epic is considered the European equivalent of the Cape Epic.

Editions

Winners

Men's winners

Women's winners

Masters winners

Grand Masters winners

Mixed winners

References

External links
 

 
Swiss Epic